The Annecy International Animation Film Festival (officially abbreviated in English as the Annecy Festival, or simply Annecy) was created in 1960 and takes place at the beginning of June in the town of Annecy, France. Initially occurring every two years, the festival became an annual event in 1998. It is one of the four international animated film festivals sponsored by the International Animated Film Association (or ASIFA).

The festival is a competition between animated films of various techniques (traditional, cut-outs, claymation, 3DCG, etc.) classified in various categories:
 Feature films
 Short films
 Films produced for television and advertising
 Student films
 Films made for the internet (since 2002)
 Feature films contrechamp in competition (since 2007)

Throughout the festival, in addition to the competing films projected in various cinemas of the city, an open-air night projection is organized on Pâquier, in the centre of town, amongst the lake and with the mountains. According to the topic of the festival, classic or recent films are projected upon the giant screen. On Saturday evening, all the award winners are presented.

Award winners

Feature films in competition

Feature films contrechamp in competition

Palmarès by producing countries

Short films
 This prize was originally named the Grand Prix. In 1987 it was renamed the Grand Prix du court métrage to differentiate it from the feature film prize. In 2003 it took its current name, the Annecy Cristal (le Cristal d'Annecy).

Films produced for television

See also
 List of animation awards

References

External links
 
  

1960 establishments in France
Animation awards
Animation film festivals
International
Annual events in France
Film festivals in France
Film festivals established in 1960
Student film festivals
Tourist attractions in Haute-Savoie